Jesús Silverio Cavazos Ceballos (15 December 1968 – 21 November 2010) was a Mexican politician, the Governor of Colima from 2005 to 2009, elected after the death of Gustavo Vázquez Montes. He was a member of the Institutional Revolutionary Party (PRI).

Cavazos was elected to finish the 2003–2009 constitutional period of Gustavo Vázquez Montes, who won a special election after the ordinary elections were annulled. However, Vázquez Montes died in a plane crash in February 2005, for which it was necessary to call a third election, which was won by Cavazos. 

He was killed outside his home by gunmen on 21 November 2010.

See also
 List of politicians killed in the Mexican Drug War

References

See also
List of Mexican state governors
Governor of Colima
2003 Colima state election
2005 Colima gubernatorial election

1968 births
2010 deaths
Governors of Colima
Institutional Revolutionary Party politicians
Politicians from Tecomán, Colima
Assassinated Mexican politicians
People murdered in Mexico
Deaths by firearm in Mexico
Politicians killed in the Mexican Drug War